KO Masters is a Romanian professional kickboxing, boxing and bare-knuckle promotion company that was founded in 2018.

The KO Masters's events are broadcast by Digi Sport in Romania and Fight Network internationally. KO Masters also aired several of their events live on Sport Extra.

The KO Masters are in partnerships with the Real Xtreme Fighting (RXF).

Events

Notable fighters

Male boxers
  Mihai Nistor

Male kickboxers
  Claudiu Alexe  
  Valentin Bordianu
  Cezar Buzdugan  
  Ionel Bălan
  Mirel Drăgan  
  Alex Filip
  Ion Grigore
  Ionuț Iancu
  Alexandru Lungu
  Florin Lupu
  Răzvan Macioi  
  Adrian Maxim
  Cristian Măniţă
  Adelin Mihăilă
  Costin Mincu  
  Amansio Paraschiv
  Alexandru Radnev
  Cristian Ristea
  Muhammed Balli
  Michael Boapeah
  Lofogo Sarour
  Max van Gelder
  Ion Surdu
  Serghei Zanosiev
  Shakib Haroun  
  Andrew Tate

Female kickboxers
  Andreea Cebuc

See also
 KO Masters in 2021
 Colosseum Tournament
 Dynamite Fighting Show
 Golden Fighter Championship
 OSS Fighters

References

External links 
KO Masters on Facebook 
Fight Network 

   

2021  establishments in Romania 
Bare-knuckle boxing
Professional boxing organizations
Kickboxing organizations  
Sports organizations established in 2021 
Companies based in Bucharest